Milan Preković (born April 6, 1973) is a former Serbian professional basketball player.

References

External links
 

1973 births
Living people
Basketball League of Serbia players
Basketball players from Belgrade
BC Samara players
KK Beobanka players
KK Beopetrol/Atlas Beograd players
KK Crvena zvezda players
KK Mašinac players
KK Profikolor players
KK Vizura players
Serbian expatriate basketball people in Bosnia and Herzegovina
Serbian expatriate basketball people in North Macedonia
Serbian expatriate basketball people in Montenegro
Serbian expatriate basketball people in the Netherlands
Serbian expatriate basketball people in Russia
Serbian expatriate basketball people in Slovenia
Serbian men's basketball players
Small forwards
Shooting guards